The Ophthalmia Range is a range in the Pilbara region of Western Australia. There are several variations of the spelling of Ophthalmia.

History
The first recorded sighting of the range was by the explorer Francis Thomas Gregory in 1861. On expedition he noted the obvious iron ore deposits that colour the range. The range was named in 1876 by Ernest Giles; Giles was temporarily blinded when he reached the area after travelling east from the headwaters of the Ashburton River and had to be led by his second in charge Alec Ross; he named the range after his condition at the time. Giles' vision later recovered and he left unimpressed with the land.

The next expedition to the area was conducted in 1896 when Aubrey Woodward Newman attempted to lead a party overland from Cue to Roebourne. Newman succumbed to typhoid before the expedition began and William Rudell took command. He later named Mount Newman in the Ophthalmia Range after his deceased leader.

Daisy Bates and her husband Jack had a pastoral lease in the Ophthalmia Range which they relinquished in 1914. The lease was subsequently taken over by William Albert Snell (1872-1942) a Western Australian Outback identity in the same year. 

The area was surveyed by a geologist named H. Talbot in 1913. Talbot travelled through the area north of Peak Hill as part of a larger survey that commenced in 1910. The survey was mostly interested in gold and copper, and made no mention of the iron ore deposits.

Mount Whaleback, which has been mined for iron ore for over 20 years, is a part of the Ophthalmia Range. The eastern end of the range is connected to the Hamersley Range.

References

Mountain ranges of Western Australia
Fortescue River